Startups in Goa refers to businesses being generated out of technology innovation and incubation centers operational or planned in Goa. While startups in the region have gained some momentum in recent years, there has been concerns raised about shortcomings faced by the same.

Government policy and 2020 proposed policy
Goa launched its startup policy on April 28, 2018. It promises creating "at least 100 successful startups" in five years time, which it said would generate jobs for 5,000, and develop "a minimum 2,00,000 lakh sq ft area for technology innovation and incubation centers" in the same period.
In July 2020, media reports noted that the Goa start-up policy was "set to lapse" in 2020, and the state had started working on "a revamped policy that will address regulatory bottlenecks and enhance funding avenues for startups."

Issues and challenges faced
There have also been hints of issues facing start-ups in Goa, including over infrastructure, ease (or lack of ease) of doing business, and the state's ability to build a corruption-free environment. Some in the field have pointed to the need for "reliable internet providers in the state, who offer good internet speeds at reasonable prices". 
Members of the Goa IT Professionals (GITP), a group of IT experts many of whom trace their roots or education to Goa but who have had to work outside the region due to a lack of sufficient opportunity here, have also raised concerns. This has emerged on the GITP WhatsApp discussion groups or in its press statements. The GITP has called for a quick implementation of official promises.
While Goa has been praised for being "among the handful of states to have achieved 100 percent rural electrification and boasts one of the best models of broadband penetration in the country", there have been concerns voiced about both efficiency of electrical supply and also Internet accessibility especially in areas away from the larger towns and urban areas.

Incubator at Verna
The Verna-based Centre for Innovation and Business Acceleration or CIBA is "a technology business incubator based in Goa and Mumbai supporting and nurturing startup companies by providing services such as incubation, modern office spaces, mentoring, networking opportunities, seed funding and rapid prototyping"  CIBA says it "creates a creative, innovative and a friendly startup culture to host future ready enterprises."

References

External links
 List of Goa startups
 List on startupgoa.org
 91springboard co-working location
 Design Valley Co-working Space in Goa from Mozaic
 CIBA Goa, co-working and business incubation
 Co-working spaces in Goa
 

Goa